Swati Rajput is an Indian actress who appears in Hindi television. Rajput is known for her small screen debut in Tum Dena Sath Mera on Life OK in 2011. Later in 2013 she  played a lead character on one of DoorDarshan National's most popular serial – Amrita, where her performance was widely appreciated. She also worked in serials like: Iss Pyaar Ko Kya Naam Doon? Ek Baar Phir and Agent Raghav – Crime Branch with Sharad Kelkar on &TV. Since March 2022, she's playing the lead role of Diya Mathur a dusky color lady in Yeh Jhuki Jhuki Si Nazar for StarPlus.

Career 
Rajput made her film debut in 2010 with Telugu film Thakita Thakita and has recently made her Bollywood debut in film Vodka Diaries with Kay Kay Menon.

Filmography

Films

Television

References

External links 
 

Indian television actresses
Indian film actresses
Living people
Year of birth missing (living people)